Robert James Montgomery (born 20 September 1891 – 10 January 1964) was a Canadian sports shooter. He was born in Lincoln, Ontario. Competing for Canada, he won a silver medal in team clay pigeons at the 1924 Summer Olympics in Paris.

He died in Boston on 10 January 1964.

References

External links

1891 births
1964 deaths
Sportspeople from Ontario
Canadian male sport shooters
Olympic shooters of Canada
Olympic silver medalists for Canada
Shooters at the 1920 Summer Olympics
Shooters at the 1924 Summer Olympics
People from the Regional Municipality of Niagara
Medalists at the 1924 Summer Olympics
Olympic medalists in shooting
20th-century Canadian people